Jason Isaacs is an English actor known for his performances on screen and stage.

He is particularly known for his performances of imperious screen villains in the early 2000s such as Lucius Malfoy in the Harry Potter films (2002-2011), as well as William Tavington in Roland Emmerich's The Patriot (2000), Captain Hook in Peter Pan (2003), and The Grand Inquisitor in Star Wars Rebels (2014–2016) and Pinball FX 3 (2017). He is also known for his performances in Ridley Scott's Black Hawk Down (2000), Rodrigo Garcia's Nine Lives (2005), Paul Greengrass' Green Zone (2010), Armando Iannucci's satirical black comedy The Death of Stalin (2017) and Fran Kranz's Mass (2021).

He is also known for his performances in television including The State Within (2006), The OA (2016–2019), and Star Trek: Discovery (2017–2018).

Filmography

Film

Television

Theatre

Video games

Soundtrack
 Peter Pan (2003) - (performer: "When I Was a Lad", "Toora Loora Lo (Hook's Harpsichord Song)")

Audiobooks
 Thunderball (2012) - Narration
 Emergency Skin (2019) - Audie Award winner for Science Fiction

Additional Crew
 The Essence of Combat: Making 'Black Hawk Down' (Video documentary 2002) (documentary footage)

Podcasts and radio

See also

References

External links

Male actor filmographies
British filmographies